Euphlyctis ghoshi (Manipur frog, Ghosh's frog) is a species of frog found in Manipur, India. It is only known from its type locality in Khugairk Reserve Forest, Manipur.

References

ghoshi
Frogs of India
Endemic fauna of Manipur
Amphibians described in 1991